The Collection is a  compilation album by American band Earth, Wind & Fire issued in 1986 on K-Tel Records. The album reached No. 5 on the UK Pop Albums chart. The Collection has also been certified Gold in the UK by the BPI.

Track listings

CD
 Boogie Wonderland (featuring The Emotions)
 Let's Groove
 Serpentine Fire
 That's The Way Of The World
 Shining Star
 After The Love Has Gone
 Let Me Talk
 September
 Got To Get You Into My Life
 Saturday Nite
 Jupiter
 I've Had Enough
 Star
 Can't Let Go
 Fantasy

Double LP
Side 1
 September
 Serpentine Fire
 Let Me Talk
 Fall In Love With Me
 Can't Let Go
 Fantasy

Side 2
 Boogie Wonderland
 Shining Star
 That's the Way of the World
 You And I
 In The Stone
 Got To Get You Into My Life

Side 3
 Let's Groove
 Jupiter
 I've Had Enough
 Be Ever Wonderful
 Magic Mind
 Saturday Nite

Side 4
 After The Love Has Gone
 Sing a Song
 Love's Holiday/Brazilian Rhyme (Interlude)
 Kalimba Tree/You Are A Winner
 Back on the Road
 Star

Charts and Certifications

Charts

Certifications

References 

Earth, Wind & Fire albums
Earth, Wind & Fire compilation albums
1986 albums
1986 compilation albums
Albums produced by Maurice White